The County of Coimbra was a political entity consisting of the lands of Coimbra, Viseu, Lamego and Santa Maria da Feira, in modern Portugal. It arose within the Kingdom of Asturias following the reconquest of the region, when the lands were granted to Hermenegildo Gutiérrez, who over the next four decades was largely responsible for the resettlement of the depopulated province.  He and his immediate successors were counts, and held Coimbra, but were not explicitly counts of Coimbra, although they are sometimes referred to as such retrospectively.  The first nobleman specifically to be called count of Coimbra was Gonzalo Muñoz, who was probably a scion of the family of Hermenegildo.  Becoming count around 959, he was one of the most powerful noblemen in the western part of the kingdom until he rose in rebellion against King Bermudo II of León and was probably killed during the region's subjugation.  The degree to which his successors were alienated from their monarch can be seen when, following the region's recapture in 987 by the Moors of Al-Mansur, Gonzalo's sons joined that general in his sack of Santiago de Compostela in 997.

The city of Coimbra was permanently secured by the Christians in 1064, having been taken by the troops of King Ferdinand I of León, led by the mozarab Sisnando Davides who would then be named its count.  It ceased to be an independent political entity when it was incorporated in the territory of the Second County of Portugal at the time of the latter's restoration in 1096 under Henry of Burgundy, and subsequently formed part of the newly founded Kingdom of Portugal under Henry's son, Afonso I.

List of counts

Early holders of Coimbra who were counts
 Hermenegildo Gutiérrez (878-920); (Conqueror of Coimbra) Dux Bellorum of Coimbra.
 Arias Menéndez (920-924), son of Hermenegildo
 Gutier Menéndez (924-934), son of Hermenegildo
 Munio Gutiérrez (934-959), son of Gutierre, son-in-law of Arias

Counts of Coimbra, first creation
 Gonzalo Muñoz (959-981), probably son of Munio
 Munio González (983-987), son of Gonzalo

Counts of Coimbra, second creation
 Sisnando Davides (1064/1075–1091)
 Martín Muñoz (1091–1093), son-in-law of Sisnando

 
Kingdom of León
History of Coimbra
History of Portugal by polity
9th century in Portugal
10th century in Portugal
11th century in Portugal
States and territories established in the 870s
States and territories disestablished in 1093
9th-century establishments in Portugal
11th-century disestablishments in Portugal
Reconquista
878 establishments